Lee Hurst (born 21 September 1970) is an English retired footballer who played as a midfielder.

Hurst spent his whole English professional career at Coventry City, making his debut at the age of 20 on 2 February 1991 when they lost 1–0 to Wimbledon in the Football League First Division at Plough Lane. He made three more league appearances that season and 10 the following season before playing 35 times for the Sky Blues (scoring two goals) in the 1992-93 campaign when they were inaugural members of the Premier League and finished 15th. He was issued with the number 8 shirt when squad numbers were introduced for the 1993-94 season but a knee injury suffered in an off-the-field training exercise at the end of the previous season meant that he never appeared in that shirt. He finally retired in 1996, three years on, having failed to recover from the injury.

In 1998, he made a football comeback by appearing 14 times for the American side Charleston Battery.

References

External links

Since 1888... The Searchable Premiership and Football League Player Database (subscription required)
Charleston Battery player registry

1970 births
Living people
English footballers
Association football midfielders
Premier League players
Coventry City F.C. players
Charleston Battery players
Sportspeople from Nuneaton
English Football League players
English expatriate footballers
Expatriate soccer players in the United States
English expatriate sportspeople in the United States